This is a list of ambassadors of the United States to Thailand.

Thailand has had continuous bilateral relations with the United States since 1882. Relations were interrupted during World War II when Bangkok was occupied by Japanese forces. Normal relations were resumed after the war in 1945.

The United States Embassy to Thailand, which was designed by Gerhard Kallmann of Kallmann McKinnell & Wood, is located in Bangkok.

Ambassadors

See also
Thailand – United States relations
Foreign relations of Thailand
Ambassadors of the United States
Embassy of the United States, Bangkok

Notes

References

Sources
United States Department of State: Background notes on Thailand

External links
 United States Department of State: Chiefs of Mission for Thailand
 United States Department of State: Thailand
 United States Embassy in Bangkok

Thailand

United States